Ukraine sent a delegation to compete at the 2010 Winter Paralympics in Vancouver, British Columbia, Canada. The country fielded a total of nineteen athletes (eleven men and eight women) in three of the Games' five sports: alpine skiing, biathlon and cross-country skiing.

Medalists

Alpine skiing

Biathlon

Cross-country skiing

See also
2010 Winter Paralympics
Ukraine at the 2010 Winter Olympics

References

External links
Vancouver 2010 Paralympic Games official website
International Paralympic Committee official website

Nations at the 2010 Winter Paralympics
Winter Paralympics
2010